The Anatomy of the Tongue in Cheek (often shortened to Anatomy) is the second full-length album released by the Christian rock band Relient K. It was released on August 28, 2001, and peaked at No. 158 on the Billboard 200. On June 26, 2006, the album was certified Gold by the RIAA for sales in excess of 500,000 units in the United States. The cover of the original release is similar to that of the 1999 Ramones release Hey Ho! Let's Go: The Anthology.

The album continues the band's liberal use of pop culture references (such as the song "I'm Lion-O," which is about the popular TV series Thundercats). Song themes range from pop culture to Christian themes—growth in faith ("Pressing On"), backsliding ("What Have You Been Doing Lately?"), worship ("Those Words Are Not Enough," "For the Moments I Feel Faint," and "Less Is More")—and social themes—such as racism and persecution ("Failure to Excommunicate"), judgementalism ("Down in Flames")—to making excuses or blaming others for one's own faults ("Maybe It's Maybeline"). There is also a song about one's experiences in high school ("Sadie Hawkins Dance").

Gotee Records released a "Gold Edition" of this album on October 31, 2006, along with the release of a "Gold Edition" of Two Lefts Don't Make a Right...but Three Do on the same day. The Gold Edition of this album has remixed and remastered in a style similar to Mmhmm (the album was remixed by the same people who mixed Mmhmm) and it has a music video for the song "Pressing On".

Track listing

Track 2 & 7, and all "First Three Gears" bonus tracks, originally from The Creepy EP.

Credits 

Relient K
 Matt Thiessen – lead vocals, guitars, acoustic piano
 Matt Hoopes – guitars, backing vocals
 Brian Pittman – bass
 Dave Douglas – drums, backing vocals

Additional personnel
 Rob Roy Fingerhead – nylon guitar, slide guitar
 Madalena Burle Marx – cello
 Ann Smith – viola
 Cory Smith – violin
 Heather Walker – violin
 Crystal Brezovsky – French horn
 Scott Cannon – gang vocals
 Kyle Hudson – gang vocals
 Kevan Peden – gang vocals

Production 
 Joey Elwood – executive producer 
 Toby McKeehan – executive producer 
 Mark Lee Townsend – producer, recording 
 F. Reid Shippen – mixing at The Castle (Nashville, Tennessee)
 Dan Shike – mix assistant 
 Randy LeRoy – editing and assembling at Final Stage (Nashville, Tennessee)
 Ted Jensen – mastering at Sterling Sound (New York City, New York)
 Mike McGlaflin – A&R 
 Aaron Marrs – creative design 
 John Falls – photography 
 Alabaster Arts – management

References to popular culture 
The last line of "Pressing On" is from The Mary Tyler Moore Show theme. "Maybe It's Maybeline" (deliberately misspelled, much like the band's name) refers to the popular Maybelline line of beauty products and its tag line.

References 

Anatomy of the Tongue in Cheek, The
Anatomy of the Tongue in Cheek, The
Anatomy of the Tongue in Cheek, The
Albums produced by Mark Lee Townsend